Joseph Charles (born 1944) is an American politician.

Joseph Charles may also refer to:

Count Palatine Joseph Charles of Sulzbach (1694–1729)
Joseph Charles (tennis) (1868–1950), American tennis player

See also